The 1971 Cincinnati Bearcats football team represented University of Cincinnati during the 1971 NCAA University Division football season. The Bearcats, led by head coach Ray Callahan, participated as independent and played their home games at Nippert Stadium.

Schedule

References

Cincinnati
Cincinnati Bearcats football seasons
Cincinnati Bearcats football